Sambalpuri Odia drama are a typical drama performance in Sambalpuri Odia language of Odisha, India.

Origin

The "naach gaana" in the streets of villages of the western Orissa regions are traditionally based on the plots of Ramayana, Mahabharata and other religion epics. During the early days Ram-Parshuram bhet was recognized as a form of street play. Currently "Ramlila" is performed in several villages. Majority of the dramas are performed in open air auditoriums where people stand surrounding the stage to observe. The great visionary Pundit Prayag Dutt Joshi wrote one drama Kapat Biha in 1936 and it was staged in Raj Khariar in that year.

Theatre and organizations

Sambalpuri drama are organized at different parts of Odisha and showcase the Sambalpuri drama theater tradition. Generally, artists from different parts of Odisha and other parts of the country are invited for this festival.
Sambalpuri Naatbadi a state level drama festival is also organized at Sadeipali, Balangir during the month of January. Various cultural organizations of  Odisha participate in the week-long Sambalpuri drama festival.
Matkhai Mahotsav, a multilingual theatre festival is also organized in Balangir town. This festival brings artists and cultural troupes from all part of India together. Various local cultural troupes also perform folk musics viz. Ghubukudu and Kendra.
Yuba Udayan Association, Jharuapara, Sambalpur started in 1997 to bring all the theatre activists together.
Veer Surendra Sai All Odisha Sambalpuri Drama Competition was born for the revival of Sambalpuri drama activities by Yuba Udayan Association, Jharuapara, Sambalpur. In the inaugural year only 19 plays were presented and the next fourteen years witnessed 455 plays being staged. Sambalpuri theatre has engaged scripts, directors and artists to work for performing these dramas.
 Belpahar Uchhab "Machan" 18 to 22 Dec every year
 Belpahar Uchhab Machan National Theatre festival. The festival started in 2004.
KRANTI  Balangir.  A 40-year-old drama organization started by Abdul Jamal khan. Kranti Balangir staged play's all over India. KRANTI stage 3-4 plays every year. One of the most popular plays by Kranti is Bigul (the beginning) by Akram Durrani.

Notable Sambalpuri Odia Drama
 "PACHEN" (The Farmer's Stick)
 "Badkha Dada" Mirror Theatre
 Kuili Kuili Kia Raja
 Maet Maa (mother earth)
 Dwithiya Gandhi
 Bhat Muthe
 Lal Paen (The Red Water)
 Pachen
 Dhankhed
 File
 Tangar
 Aljhat
 E Phul
 Pari
 Ram Naam Sat Rahe
 Aahinsaka
 Bhok
 Antankbad (Kranti Balangir)
 Tanko
 Guhu
 Kurey Phular Katha
 Antra (Kranti balangir)
 Ubelia Utpat
 Siluan
 Angen
 Mousumi (A Symbolic Pay on Monsoon wind)
 Tumar aamar Katha
 Surusthi
 Aintha
 Ujaar
 Gadhar Katha
 Kua ra Gharen Kuili Raja
 Luhur Rang
 Vikash (The Development)
 Tokemara
 Khaman Rani
 Lahanger
 Tokemara
 Tirkut
 Bhanga Kachen Chaka Jan
 Bigul By Akram durrani (Kranti Balangir)
 Badkha Dada by Mirror Theatre, Belpahar
 April-27 (a Sambalpuri Solo play) by Mirror Theatre, Belpahar
 Black Paradise by Akram durrani(Kranti balangir)
Swayam Brahma by Akram durrani (Kranti balangir )
Adham
Chhuchhata
Asha
Ramarajya
Laal chithi
Debri gaal
Time-up By Akram Durrani  (Mime)
Rikshabala
Joker
Vaisnaba Janato
Tar sesh Ichha
Santha Kabi Bhima Bhoi

References

External links
Orissa revives its culture with Kosli Naatbadi fest 
Kosli Naatbadi 

India
Indian culture
Odia culture
Performing arts in India
Theatre in India